Jerônimo Monteiro is a municipality located in the Brazilian state of Espírito Santo. Its population was 12,265 (2020) and its area is 162 km².

References

Municipalities in Espírito Santo